HMS Spey is a Batch 2  offshore patrol vessel of the Royal Navy. Named after the River Spey in Scotland, she is the eighth Royal Navy ship to be named Spey and is the fifth Batch 2 River-class vessel to commission and is forward deployed long-term to the Indo-Pacific region with her sister ship .

Construction
On 6 November 2013 it was announced that the Royal Navy had signed an Agreement in Principle to build three new offshore patrol vessels, based on the River-class design, at a fixed price of £348 million including spares and support. In August 2014, BAE Systems signed the contract to build the ships on the Clyde in Scotland. The Ministry of Defence stated that the Batch 2 ships are capable of being used for constabulary duties such as "counter-terrorism, counter-piracy and anti-smuggling operations". According to BAE Systems, the vessels are designed to deploy globally, conducting anti-piracy, counter-terrorism and anti-smuggling tasks currently conducted by frigates and destroyers. A £287m order, for two further ships,  and Spey, and support for all five Batch 2 ships, was announced on 8 December 2016.

Batch 2 ships such as Spey include some 29 modifications and enhancements over the  built by BAE Systems for the Brazilian Navy. Tamar and Spey have further modifications such as carbon dioxide reducing catalytic converters.

Spey was formally named on 3 October 2019. She began contractor sea trials in September 2020, and after they were completed, left the Clyde on 28 October for the delivery voyage to Portsmouth.

Operational history
On 7 January 2021, HMS Spey was handed over to the Royal Navy in Portsmouth. In late spring 2021, Spey received "dazzle" camouflage in Falmouth in preparation for deploying to the Indo-Pacific region with sister ship Tamar. Spey was commissioned into the Royal Navy at her affiliated town, Invergordon on 18 June 2021. On 7 September, Spey and sister Tamar departed Portsmouth to be forward deployed to the Indo-Pacific region for a minimum of five years.

On 21 January 2022, Spey was deployed to Tonga as relief aid due to the 2022 Hunga Tonga–Hunga Ha'apai eruption and tsunami.

References

External links 

 

 

River-class patrol vessels
Ships built on the River Clyde
Ships of the Fishery Protection Squadron of the United Kingdom
2019 ships